Chapel (meaning chapel of lapwings) is a hamlet in Cornwall, England.

References

Hamlets in Cornwall